This is a list of people who held the office of mayor of the Metropolitan Borough of Chelsea. The office was created in 1900 and abolished in 1965 when Chelsea became part of the larger Royal Borough of Kensington and Chelsea.

List of mayors of Chelsea from 19001965 
 19001901 Earl Cadogan
 19011902 Major William Fountain Woods 
 19021903 Major William Fountain Woods (second term)
 19031904 Major William Fountain Woods (third term)
 19041905 James Jeffery
 19051906 William John Mulvey 
 19061907 William Sidney 
 19071908 William Sidney (second term)
 19081909 Rev. Henry Reginald Gamble 
 19091910 Christopher Head 
 19101911 Christopher Head (second term)
 19111912 Frederick John Welch 
 19121913 Frederick John Welch (second term)
 19131914 Frederick John Welch (third term)
 19141915 Rev. Robert Hudson 
 19151916 Rev. Robert Hudson (second term) 
 19161917 Rev. Robert Hudson (third term) 
 19171918 Rev. Robert Hudson (fourth term) 
 19181919 Rev. Robert Hudson (fifth term) 
 19191920 Ernest Burrell Baggallay 
 19201921 John Ewer Jefferson Hogg 
 19211922 John Ewer Jefferson Hogg (second term) 
 19221923 John Ewer Jefferson Hogg (third term) 
 19231924 John Ewer Jefferson Hogg (fourth term) 
 19241925 Sir Albert Gray 
 19251926 Alfred Charles Seton Christopher 
 19261927 Charles Blackstone Clapcott 
 19271928 Charles Blackstone Clapcott (second term) 
 19281929 Charles Blackstone Clapcott (third term) 
 19291930 Lady Margaret Percy Phipps 
 19301931 Lady Margaret Percy Phipps (second term) 
 19311932 Lieutenant-Colonel Samuel Boyle 
 19321933 Lieutenant-Colonel Samuel Boyle (second term) 
 19331934 Lieutenant-Colonel Samuel Boyle (third term)
 19341935 Lieutenant-Colonel Samuel Boyle (fourth term)
 19351936 Lieutenant-Colonel Samuel Boyle (fifth term) 
 19361937 Lieutenant-Colonel Samuel Boyle (sixth term) 
 19371938 George Frederick Wilkins 
 19381939 George Frederick Wilkins (second term) 
 19391940 Lady Clare Isma Hartnell 
 19401941 Lady Clare Isma Hartnell (second term) 
 19411942 Robert Gillingham Wharam 
 19421943 Robert Gillingham Wharam (second term)
 19431944 Robert Gillingham Wharam (third term)
 19441945 Major Gerald Alfred Thesiger
 19451946 Major Gerald Alfred Thesiger (second term) 
 19461947 Herbert Gwynne Evans M.C.
 19471949 George Lane Tunbridge
 19491950 George Lane Tunbridge (second term)
 19501951 Captain Roderick Latimer Mackenzie Edwards RN
 19511952 Captain Roderick Latimer Mackenzie Edwards RN (second term)
 19521953 Mary K Cook
 19531954 Mary K Cook (second term)
 19541955 Guy Edmiston
 19551956 Arthur J Sims - later first mayor of the Royal Borough of Kensington and Chelsea
 19561957 Arthur J Sims (second term)
 19571958 Basil Futvoye Marsden-Smedley
 19581959 Basil Marsden-Smedley (second term)
 19591960 Katharine Acland
 19601961 Katharine Acland (second term)
 19611962 John Stewart Tatton-Brown 
 19621963 Vice-Admiral John Walter Durnford
 19631964 Lady Dorothy Mary Heath
 19641965 Earl Cadogan (grandson of first mayor)

References 

Chelsea